Sir Archibald Auldjo Jamieson KBE MC (1884 – 23 October 1959) was a British soldier and businessman, chairman of the British arms and aircraft company Vickers during World War II.

Family
His father George was a senior partner in the Edinburgh accountancy firm Lindsay, Jamieson, and Haldane, and a councillor in Edinburgh; his mother was George Jamieson's second wife, Susan Helena (née Oliphant). He was educated at Winchester College and New College, Oxford. He trained as an accountant. He served during the First World War, being mentioned in despatches and awarded the Military Cross.

In 1917 he married Doris Pearce, daughter of Henry Pearce, RN; the couple had two sons and two daughters; their eldest son was David Auldjo Jamieson who was awarded the VC in 1944 during the Second World War. Their other son Gerald James "Jerrie" (died 1992) was married to Lady Mariegold Fitzalan-Howard, daughter of the 3rd Baron Howard of Glossop. Jamieson himself was knighted (KBE) in 1946. Lady Doris died in 1947. In 1956, he remarried, to Margretta Stroup Austin. He died three years later, in 1959.

Career
Jamieson became a director of armaments company Vickers in 1928 and chairman in 1937; in the late 1930s he helped integrate the main firm more closely with its subsidiaries, increasing production in the run-up to World War II.

Notes

References
 JAMIESON, Sir Archibald Auldjo, Who Was Who, A & C Black, an imprint of Bloomsbury Publishing plc., 1920–2008; online edition, Oxford University Press, December 2012; online edition, November 2012 accessed 30 December 2012

People educated at Winchester College
Alumni of New College, Oxford
Knights Commander of the Order of the British Empire
Recipients of the Military Cross
1884 births
1959 deaths
Date of birth unknown
Royal Scots officers
British Army personnel of World War I